Suhruthu is a 1952 Indian Malayalam-language film, directed by Joseph Pallippaattu. The film stars M. S. Namboothiri and Alex Parakkal. The film had musical score by G. Viswanath.

Cast
 M. S. Namboothiri
 Alex Parakkal
 G. M. Hastings
 M. P. Sanku
 P. M. Revamma
 V. Ramachandran
 P. K. Sankar

References

1952 films
1950s Malayalam-language films